Playa de Levante is a beach in the municipality of La Línea de la Concepción, in the Province of Cádiz, Andalusia, Spain, located to the north of Gibraltar. It has all the basic services required of an urban beach, daily waste collection season, toilets, showers and disabled access and presence of police and local rescue equipment.

References

La Línea de la Concepción
Beaches of Andalusia